Events in the year 1139 in Portugal.

Incumbents
King: Afonso I of Portugal

Events
Battle of Ourique

References

Portugal
12th century in Portugal
Portugal